Copa Sul-Minas was a Brazilian football competition that ran between 2000 and 2002, with teams from the three Southern states of Brazil, plus the Southeastern state of Minas Gerais. It replaced the 1999 tournament called Copa Sul which only included teams from the Southern states. In 2016, a successor to this tournament was created, the Copa Sul-Minas-Rio (also known as Primeira Liga), in this tournament there were not only teams from the Southern states and Minas Gerais, but they also added teams from Rio de Janeiro.

In its three editions, Copa Sul-Minas was won by Minas Gerais teams.

List of finals

Copa Sul

Copa Sul-Minas

Copa Sul-Minas-Rio

References

Defunct football competitions in Brazil